Louis Henri Joseph de Bourbon (13 April 1756 – 30 August 1830) was the Prince of Condé from 1818 to his death. He was the brother-in-law of Philippe Égalité and nephew of Victoire de Rohan.

Life
Louis Henri was the only son of Louis Joseph, Prince of Condé by his first wife, Charlotte de Rohan, daughter of Charles de Rohan, Prince of Soubise. As a member of the reigning House of Bourbon, he was a prince du sang and was entitled to the style of Serene Highness, prior to his accession to the Condé title, while he was known as the duke of Enghien and later as Duke of Bourbon. On succeeding his father he was entitled to the style of Royal Highness.

Marriage
On 24 April 1770, he married Bathilde d'Orléans, the only surviving daughter of Louis Philippe d'Orléans, Duke of Orléans and Louise Henriette de Bourbon. The couple were married in the chapel at the Palace of Versailles and were descended from Louis XIV to the same degree, their paternal great grandmothers were sisters, daughters of Madame de Montespan. In 1772 their only son, Louis Antoine, Duke of Enghien, was born. The marriage was not a happy one, and in 1780 the couple separated. Louis never remarried.

Shortly afterwards, Louis Henri began a public affair with an opera singer Marguerite “Mimi” Michelot, which resulted in two illegitimate daughters, one of whom, Adèle, went on to marry the Comte de Reuilly. During the French Revolution, Louis Henri accompanied his father into exile in England and survived the purge of the House of Bourbon in France, which cost the life of King Louis XVI and his wife Queen Marie Antoinette amongst others.

In 1804, his son, the Duke of Enghien, was abducted in Germany by order of Napoleon and executed in the moat of the Château de Vincennes on trumped up charges of treason. The Duke of Enghien had been married to Charlotte Louise de Rohan for less than two months and had no issue.

Louis Henri returned with his father to France after the defeat of Napoleon in 1814, and both recovered their fortunes and public status. On his father's death in 1818, he assumed the title of Prince de Condé.

Restoration 
During the 1814 restoration, the Prince, as Duke of Bourbon, became the namesake for the 8th Bourbon Light Horse Regiment (8ème Régiment de Chasseurs à Cheval de Bourbon).  However, following Napoleon's return in March 1815, the regiment joined Napoleon and he emigrated to Belgium.  Within the Infantry Corps, the Prince was made Colonel General of the Light Infantry and consequently became the namesake for the Bourbon Line Infantry Regiment which was formed by the merger of the 9th Line Infantry Regiment (9ème Régiment d'Infanterie de Ligne) and the 2nd & 7th Battalions of the 37th Light Infantry Regiment (37ème Régiment d'Infanterie Légère). This regiment also joined Napoleon after his return from Elba in March 1815.

End of the Condé

While in exile in 1811, the duc de Bourbon had made the acquaintance at a bordello in Piccadilly of Sophia Dawes or Daw, a maid in a brothel from the Isle of Wight. He set the woman and her mother up in London in a house on Gloucester Street. There, she went through an extensive educational program.

After the Bourbon Restoration in 1815, Louis Henri brought her to Paris and arranged a marriage for her to Baron Adrien Victor de Feucheres, an officer in the royal guard. This was done to allow Sophia’s entry into French society. However, in the course of setting up her marriage license, Sophia lied on several particulars. Feucheres, who became an aide to the duke, believed for several years that Sophia was a natural daughter of Louis Henri II. When he discovered the truth, he separated from his wife, and informed King Louis XVIII of the real relationship between Louis Henri and Sophia. The king banned Sophia from court.

In revenge, Sophia approached the head of the House of Orléans, the Duke of Orleans, and through him made a new entry into society. In return, she agreed to use her influence on the aging Louis Henri II to have him set up a will making the son of Louis Philippe, Prince Henri, Duke of Aumale, the old prince's main heir. Sophia was given two million francs for her services in the matter. The new Bourbon king, Charles X, eventually accepted her back at court. She was again considered acceptable by polite French society. She was even able to arrange the marriage of a niece to a nephew of Talleyrand.

By now, Louis Henri was trying to get away from the mistress who had taken over his life. In the summer of 1830, he returned to his home at St. Leu. There, he heard of the July Revolution. Sophia immediately set about to get him to recognize the new Orléans monarchy. 

When on 27 August 1830 he was found dead with a rope around his neck but his feet on the ground, the baroness was suspected, but an inquiry was held which formally declared the death to be a suicide. There were rumours that the new King of the French, Louis-Philippe, had collaborated with Sophia in the crime as they feared that she and Louis Phillippe's son Aumale – the testamentary heirs of Condé – might be disinherited by the Prince after a possible flight abroad. Later, rumours circulated amongst the nobility that Condé had died pleasuring himself, engaged in what would later be known as autoerotic asphyxiation. With the evidence of death being the result of any crime appearing insufficient, the baroness was not prosecuted, although she was involved in litigation regarding the inheritance for years to come.

There are some aspects of the relationship between Sophia and the Prince that William Thackeray may have had in mind in the novel Vanity Fair regarding Becky Sharp, possibly killing Joseph Sedley. With Louis Henri's death the line of Bourbon-Condé came to an end; his lands and wealth passed to his godson, the Duke of Aumale. His father, Louis Philippe, was the feudal-law heir to Conti and Condé, being the grandson of Louise Henriette de Bourbon, a daughter of Louise Élisabeth de Bourbon, who was sister of Louis Henri II's grandfather.

Issue

Louis Antoine de Bourbon, Duke of Enghien (2 August 1772 – 21 March 1804); died without issue.
Adélaïde “Adele” de Bourbon (10 November 1780 – 26 May 1874); styled Mademoiselle de Bourbon: illegitimate with Marguerite Michelot. She married firstly in 1803 to Patrice Gabriel Bernard de Montessus, comte de Reuilly, and secondly on 24 June 1833 to Guy Eugène Victor, marquis de Chaumont-Quitry. No issue.
Louise Charlotte Aglaé de Bourbon (10 September 1782 – 1831); illegitimate with Marguerite Michelot. Unmarried.
Daughter* (born December 1817, lived a few days); illegitimate with certain Sophie Harris.
Son* (stillborn May 1819); illegitimate with certain Sophie Harris.

Ancestry

Footnotes

References

Smith-Hughes, Jack, Eight Studies in Justice (London: Cassell & Co., 1953), p. 124-153, Ch. VI: "Royal Justice: The Conscience of a Citizen-King".

External links

Louis Henri
Princes of France (Bourbon)
Princes of Condé
Louis Henri
206
Dukes of Enghien
1756 births
1830 deaths
Nobility from Paris
Knights of the Golden Fleece of Spain
Burials at the Basilica of Saint-Denis
18th-century peers of France
Members of the Chamber of Peers of the Bourbon Restoration
Suicides by hanging in France